Arrah is a city in the Indian state of Bihar. Arrah may also refer to:

Places 
 Arrah, Ivory Coast

Constituencies 
 Arrah (Vidhan Sabha constituency)
 Arrah (Lok Sabha constituency)